The Garay alphabet was designed in 1961, as a transcription system "[marrying] African sociolinguistic characteristics" according to its inventor, Assane Faye. This alphabet has 25 consonants and 14 vowels. It is used in particular for the writing of the Wolof language, spoken mostly in Senegal, although it is more often written in the Latin alphabet. It is written from right to left, and distinguishes letter case.

A proposal to encode Garay in Unicode was submitted in 2012.

Letters

Consonants
The consonants are written as standalone letters and are not joined as in Arabic.

There is a mark above some letters to show pre-nasalization. The letter labeled alif is used like its counterpart in Arabic, coming before an initial vowel. Extra to the standard Wolof set is /ħ/, available for Arabic loan words. Lacking is /q/, but /k/ may suffice for that. Also lacking is /nk/, but that may easily be formed with a mark above, like /mb/ etc.

In Garay, uppercase letters are distinguished from lowercase letters by a swash added to one side or the other of the letter. Each sentence begins with a capital letter. Personal names are likewise capitalized.

Vowels

Numbers

References

Bibliography

External links 
 Discover Garay, Movement of Teachers of African Languages in Senegal (MELAS).
 
 

Writing systems introduced in 1961
Writing systems of Africa
Wolof language
Right-to-left writing systems